The Bill is a Polish punk rock band, formed in 1988 by Artur "Soko" Soczewica, in the Polish town of Pionki. The band's name is pronounced in a similar way to the Polish word 'debil', which means 'moron'. The Bill played several times at the Jarocin Festival and The Great Orchestra of Christmas Charity finales.

Past Band members
Jacek "Szmery" Szulikowski - drumset (1988-1989)
Robert "Mielony" Mielniczuk - drumset (1989-2011)
Artur "Soko" Soczewica - bass guitar, vocals (left band after "I give you fire" album in 1996) 
Dariusz "Skóra" Stawski - vocals (Played with the band, but was never an official member)
"Jędrek" - guitar (2000 - 2005)
"Ludek" - bass guitar (2000 - 2005)
Maciej "McKurczak" Stępień - bass guitar, vocals (2005 - 2010)

Current band members 

Dariusz "Kefir" Śmietanka - guitar, vocal
Gerard "Gere" Chodyra - bass guitar
Sebastian Stańczak - guitar, vocal
Artur "Artie" Woźniak - drumset

Discography
1993 - The Biut (pronounced similar to 'debiut' meaning 'debut')
1994 - Początek Końca (The Beginning of the End)
1995 - Sex 'N' Roll
2000 - Daję wam ogień (I Give You Fire) - recorded in 1996, but not released until 2000
2007 - Niech tańczą aniołowie (Let the Angels Dance)
2013 - 8siem

Polish musical groups
Polish punk rock groups